Malice in Wonderland may refer to:

Film
 Malice in Wonderland (1985 film), an American TV movie starring Elizabeth Taylor and Jane Alexander
 Malice in Wonderland (2009 film), a British fantasy adventure film
 Malice in Wonderland: The Dolls Movie, a 2011 American comedy starring the drag theater troupe The Dolls

Television
"Malice in Wonderland", January 18, 1959 episode of Omnibus, starring Keenan Wynn
"Malice in Wonderland" (Charmed), October 2, 2005 episode of television series Charmed
"Malice in Wonderland!", August 16, 2007 episode of Pokémon: Diamond and Pearl

Music
 Malice in Wonderland (band), a Norwegian hard rock band
 Malice in Wonderland (Nazareth album)
 Malice in Wonderland (Paice Ashton Lord album), or the title song
 Malice n Wonderland, an album by Snoop Dogg
 Malice in Wonderland (Goldie album), an album by Goldie

Books
 Malice in Wonderland (1940 novel) by Nicholas Blake
Malice in Wonderland: My Adventures in the World of Cecil Beaton (2021), biography by Hugo Vickers

See also
 Alice in Wonderland (disambiguation)